Courthouse News Service is a news service primarily focusing on civil litigation. Its core audience is lawyers and law firms, who subscribe to the service; other subscribers include nonprofits, government agencies, corporations, other media outlets, and academic institutions. Courthouse News has reporters across the United States, covering both state and federal court proceedings, in trial courts and appellate courts. It offers both free and paid services. Unlike CourtExpress and CourtLink, it does not provide comprehensive docket information; rather, Courthouse News alerts readers to new filings and rulings. The news agency is based in Pasadena, California. As of 2020, the service had more than 2,200 subscribers. It is a competitor to Thomson Reuters, LexisNexis, and Bloomberg. 

In addition to covering litigation, Courthouse News also covers federal legislation and congressional activity. It is a member of the Senate Press Gallery.

Courthouse News was founded in 1990. During the 2020 COVID-19 pandemic, the group received between US$2 million and $5 million in federally backed small business loans from City National Bank as part of the Paycheck Protection Program. The organization stated that the money would help it retain 256 employees.

References

External links 

 

News agencies based in the United States
Companies based in Pasadena, California
American legal websites
Mass media in Pasadena, California